English group Bananarama have released 12 studio albums, two live albums, 16 compilation albums, two extended plays, 50 singles (including three as a featured artist) and four video albums.

Albums

Studio albums

Live albums

Compilation albums

Extended plays

Singles

As lead artist

As featured artist

Promotional singles

Other charted songs

Guest appearances

Video albums

Notes

References

External links
 
 
 
 

Discographies of British artists
Pop music group discographies